= Gangubai Nivrutti Bhambure =

Indian Sarpanch

Gangubai Vivrutti Bhambure is the oldest Sarpanch of Bhamburwadi, a village located in Khed Taluka of Pune district. As the sole candidate she received unanimous support from all nine members of the gram panchayat during the elections in September 2016. She was elected as a member of the gram panchayat in October 2015 when she defeated her rival, another woman with a margin of 50 votes. Gangubai's agenda for her village revolves around development-related issues in her village. The closest canal from her village is 2 kilometers away and Gangubai plans to construct a pipeline so that the parched lands in her village can get water. She also looks to develop a proper drainage system, building good roads, and ensuring that there are enough toilets.

== Personal life ==
Gangubai Nivrutti Bhambure lost her husband ten years ago and has four sons and one daughter. She is self-taught and despite no formal education is able to read. In an interview with Indian Express, Gangubai said that her day begins at 5 am every day, she tackles her household chores and then sets out to inspect daily happenings in her village. Gangubai is quoted as saying "Eat less and live longer - that's my secret of life,"
